Al Suwaiq is a coastal wilayah (province) in the region of Al Bāţinah, in northeastern Oman.
The name of the town refers in Arabic to "market"; it is named this because it is located in central Al Batinah and attracted not only the people who lived in the mountains but also people who lived by the region's coast to buy and sell goods.

A'Suwaiq is one of Al-Batinah-north governorates' wilayat. It is 48 km wide and 80 km long. The nature of this wilayah blends four terrains: coasts, plains, mountains and valleys. A'Suwaiq is special for its long coastline and known as the largest wilayah in Oman. It is 135 km far from the capital Muscat. A'Suwaiq is bordered by Al Mosina'a from the east, Al-Khaboura from the west, the Gulf of Oman from north and Al-Hoqain from the south.

There are about 20 historic buildings (houses, castles, forts and fortress) distributed in its villages. Most of these historic buildings have deteriorated and need to be restored. The most famous forts are: A'Suwaiq fort, Al Tharmad fort, Al Hilal fort, Al Mghabsha fort, Al Borusheed fort. Also, there is an old mosque called Al Sabbara. This mosque was built during the reign of Ahmed bin Sa'aeed.

A'Suwaiq fort
It mediates A'Suwaiq, in A'Suwaiq souq (old market), and the entrance of the fort facing the sea. Its rectangular shape contains three circular-shaped towers and one square shape. It is 60 meters length and 43 meters wide. Inside the fort there is a smaller fort. The fort used to be the headquarters of the governor. It was built of mud, stones and Omani plaster, and it was restored by the Ministry of Heritage and Culture in 1992.

Al Mabrah Village
Al Mabrah Village is affiliated to wilayah As'Souaiq. Its location is near the Western Hajar Mountains. The village's tourist appeal derives from its outstanding geographic location, the scenic views, and the geometric design of Aflaj which are coming from Wadi Al Asdani. This falaj extended to 3 km from the wadis' heart to the village. Also, it is considered as the main water source for irrigation in Al Mabrah village.

References

 
Populated places in Oman
Populated coastal places in Oman